The rufous-necked sparrowhawk (Accipiter erythrauchen) is a species of bird of prey in the family Accipitridae. It is endemic to the Maluku Islands of Indonesia. Its natural habitats are subtropical or tropical moist lowland forest and subtropical or tropical moist montane forest.

Description
It is mostly grey with a rufous neck with yellow feet and yellow black-tipped bill. The juvenile is brown.

References

rufous-necked sparrowhawk
Birds of the Maluku Islands
rufous-necked sparrowhawk
rufous-necked sparrowhawk
Taxonomy articles created by Polbot